ANS is a box set by Coil. The album uses a strange and esoteric photoelectric synthesizer known as the ANS synthesizer. It was built around half a century ago and still to this day sits where it was originally conceived; in the Moscow State University.

Release history
This 3 CD release also came with a DVD that held animations created by Peter Christopherson which synched with four songs that are not included on any of the CDs. It is an expanded release of ANS, with CD A being the same as that release.

Originally limited to 500 copies, it was re-released together with several other albums. The re-release appears to be mostly identical to the original edition, the only notable difference being that the front covers of the CDs and DVD are slightly different now.

Several of the drawings that were made to create the music are shown, although it is nowhere stated to which track the drawings do correspond.

It is stated in the insert that the songs are the work of Jhonn Balance solo, Jhonn Balance and Ossian Brown, Peter Christopherson solo, Thighpaulsandra solo, Ivan Pavlov solo and Jhonn Balance and Ivan Pavlov, although it is nowhere stated to whom which track corresponds.

All of the tracks present on the CDs and DVD are untitled.

Track listing

"CD A"
 20:54
 25:38
 29:39

"CD B"
 26:22
 30:18

"CD C"
 28:04
 32:06

"DVD"
 15:36
 10:10
 15:36
 20:55

References

External links
 
 
 ANS at Brainwashed

2004 compilation albums
Threshold House compilation albums
Coil (band) compilation albums